Wola Krzysztoporska  is a village in Piotrków County, Łódź Voivodeship, in central Poland. It is the seat of the gmina (administrative district) called Gmina Wola Krzysztoporska.

The village has a population of 2,100.

References

Wola Krzysztoporska
Piotrków Governorate
Łódź Voivodeship (1919–1939)